Dihydrotachysterol (DHT) is a synthetic vitamin D analog activated in the liver that does not require renal hydroxylation like vitamin D2 (ergocalciferol) and vitamin D3 (cholecalciferol). DHT has a rapid onset of action (2 hours), a shorter half-life, and a greater effect on mineralization of bone salts than does vitamin D.

References 

Secosteroids
Vitamin D
Indanes
Conjugated dienes